Sil-gochu, often translated as chili threads, chilli threads, or chili pepper threads, is a traditional Korean food garnish made with chili peppers.

Gallery

See also 
 Egg garnish

References 

Chili pepper dishes
Food and drink decorations
Korean cuisine